Trust Fall (Side A) is a four-track EP by alternative rock band Incubus. It was released in 2015 on Island Records. It was the first release from the band since their 2011 album, If Not Now, When?.

A sequel to this EP was later released 5 years later in 2020 as Trust Fall (Side B).

Background
The writing and production of the EP began in late 2014 following a Sons of the Seas tour fronted by Brandon Boyd. The EP was the first of "at least two" EPs that Incubus planned to release in 2015; they ultimately did not release a second EP that year. Brandon Boyd and Mike Einziger stated in an interview for #Letstalkmusic that the EP format was chosen so they could release some new songs prior to a tour, then finish the rest of the album when they returned.

Promotion
The lead single from the EP, "Absolution Calling", debuted on KROQ. It was followed by a music video.

Trust Fall (Side A) was supported by a 2015 Summer tour in the United States, following an earlier tour in 2015 through Australia and Southeast Asia.

Track listing

Personnel
Credits adapted from EP's liner notes.

Incubus
 Brandon Boyd – lead vocals, rhythm guitar, melodies, percussion, producer, engineer
 Michael Einziger – lead guitar, piano, backing vocals, string orchestration and arrangements, conducting, producer, engineer
 Jose Pasillas II – drums, engineer
 Chris Kilmore – piano, keyboards, Mellotron, organ, turntables, engineer
 Ben Kenney – bass guitar, backing vocals, engineer

Additional personnel
 Seth Waldmann – engineer
 Matthew O'Driscoll – assistant engineer
 Dave Holdredge – additional engineering
 Dave Sardy – mixing
 Cameron Barton – mix engineer
 Stephen Marcussen – mastering

Artwork
 Brandon Boyd – art direction
 Brian Bowen Smith – photography

Charts

References

2015 EPs
Incubus (band) albums